Nandopsis is a small genus of cichlid fishes found in lakes, streams and rivers in Cuba and Hispaniola. Nandopsis are the only cichlids native to the Antilles.

Species
The genus currently contains three species. An additional species, N. vombergae is recognized by some, but considered a synonym of N. haitiensis by FishBase.
 Nandopsis haitiensis (Tee-Van, 1935) (Haitian cichlid)
 Nandopsis ramsdeni (Fowler, 1938) (Joturo)
 Nandopsis tetracanthus (Valenciennes, 1831) (Biajaca)

References

Heroini
Fish of the Dominican Republic
Fish of the Caribbean
Fish of Cuba
Cichlid genera
Taxa named by Theodore Gill